"Lost Me" is a song by American singer-songwriter Giveon. It was released through Epic Records and Not So Fast as the third single from his debut studio album, Give or Take, on June 24, 2022.

Charts

Release history

References

2022 songs
2022 singles
Giveon songs
Songs written by Giveon
Songs written by Sevn Thomas
Songs written by Oz (record producer)